Gujarat's twelfth legislative election was held in 2007. In this election, the BJP led by Narendra Modi won 117 seats out of 182 (ten seats fewer than in 2002). Congress improved its performance and won 59 seats (eight more than last election). Modi fought elections in Maninagar and won with a major majority. NCP won three seats, JDU won only one seat and independent candidates won only two seats. This was a turning point of Modi in politics.

Campaigns

Bhartiya Janta Party 
BJP Manifesto:

Election manifesto was released by Gujarat BJP in the year 2007. The main points of which are as follows:

 A poverty-free Gujarat was promised, according to which there will be no poor in Gujarat. This is not a concept but actual planning.

 Gujarat's domestic production will be doubled, blueprint prepared.

 Annual per capita income in Gujarat is Rs. 80,000 determined to carry on.

 BJP will prioritize honesty and transparency in governance and administration of Gujarat.

 Gujarat's power generation will be doubled in five years. The production will be increased to twenty thousand MW.

 In the next five years, not a single house in Gujarat will be left without electricity connection.

 Gujarat will achieve the best position in financial and technical matters in the near future.

 Irrigation capacity will be increased by one and a half times.

 Giving huge relief in irrigation rates to farmers, determined to make them rich.

 BJP will give priority to increase the coverage of education and make the level of education international standards.

 Determination to make Gujarat the center of the world in the field of science and technology.

 Determination to make Gujarat the number one best state in the country on the occasion of Gujarat's Golden Jubilee in the year 2010.

 Houses will be provided to the homeless poor in urban and rural areas.

 Dropout ratio in primary education will be taken to zero percent.

 All houses will be provided with clean drinking water through taps.

 Comprehensive insurance cover for the poor.

 Perennial roads to all villages.

 Healthy, clean and serene Gujarat.

 Developmental use of youth power.

 People of all castes, religions.

 Department of Floriculture will be constituted.

 Relief of up to fifty percent in irrigation rates to small and marginal farmers.

 Goal of 100 percent enrollment in primary education.

 Comprehensive insurance cover for the poor.

 For the development of youth power in Gujarat Rs. A revolving fund of one thousand crores will be created.

 Special care will be taken for elders and children of the state.

 Many special schemes will be implemented for the overall development of Scheduled Castes, Scheduled Tribes, Urban Poor, Sagarkhedu, Growing Castes during five years.

 Commitment to grow industries.

 BJP will continue to work to accelerate Gujarat's progress towards green revolution.

 Care will be taken to ensure that farmers get value addition on farm produce.

 Emphasis will be placed on women empowerment.

 The development of organized and unorganized sector workers will be achieved, Gujarat can be developed only through their development. An independent commission will be constituted to formulate a comprehensive plan for workforce development.

 Determination was expressed to provide security and safety to the people of Gujarat. Terrorism and anti-social activities will be banned.

 An important target for the overall development of Gujarat, a growth rate of 12 percent per annum will be achieved in the next five years.

Indian National Congress

Results

Results by constituency
The list of the members of the Gujarat Vidhan Sabha are as follows:

Bypolls

See also
 List of constituencies of the Gujarat Legislative Assembly
 2007 elections in India

References 

State Assembly elections in Gujarat
2000s in Gujarat
Gujarat